Alvestad is a surname. Notable people with the surname include:

 Anton Ludvig Alvestad (1883–1956), Norwegian politician and government minister
 Olaus Alvestad (1866–1903), Norwegian educator and newspaper editor
 Per Olav Alvestad, Norwegian television host